Phenacolepadidae is a family of small sea snails or false limpets, marine gastropod mollusks in the clade Cycloneritimorpha (according to the taxonomy of the Gastropoda by Bouchet & Rocroi, 2005).

This family has no subfamilies according to the taxonomy of the Gastropoda by Bouchet & Rocroi, 2005.

Although the shell shape of genera in this family is that of a limpet, the family is in fact closely related to the Neritidae, the nerites.

Genera and species
Genera and species within the family Phenacolepadidae include:
 Subfamily Phenacolepadinae Pilsbry, 1895
 Hyalopatina Dall, 1889
 Magadis Melvill & Standen, 1899
 Plesiothyreus Cossman, 1888
 Zacalantica Iredale, 1929
 Subfamily Shinkailepadinae Okutani, Saito & Hashimoto, 1989
 Divia Fukumori, Yahagi, Warén & Kano, 2019
 Shinkailepas Okutani et al., 1989 - a  hydrothermal vent genus
 Thalassonerita Moroni, 1966
 Genera brought into synonymy
 Cinnalapeta Iredale, 1929: synonym of Plesiothyreus Cossmann, 1888
 Olgasolaris L. Beck, 1992: synonym of Shinkailepas Okutani, Saito & Hashimoto, 1989
 Phenacolepas Pilsbry, 1891: synonym of Plesiothyreus Cossmann, 1888
 Scutellina Gray, 1847: synonym of Plesiothyreus Cossmann, 1888

References 

 Bouchet P., Rocroi J.P., Hausdorf B., Kaim A., Kano Y., Nützel A., Parkhaev P., Schrödl M. & Strong E.E. (2017). Revised classification, nomenclator and typification of gastropod and monoplacophoran families. Malacologia. 61(1-2): 1-526

External links 
 Fukumori H., Yahagi T., Warén A. & Kano Y. (2019). Amended generic classification of the marine gastropod family Phenacolepadidae: transitions from snails to limpets and shallow-water to deep-sea hydrothermal vents and cold seeps. Zoological Journal of the Linnean Society. 185(3): 636-655